Norman Allan Miller  (born 1956) is a politician in Ontario, Canada. He was a member of the Legislative Assembly of Ontario, representing the riding of Parry Sound—Muskoka for the Progressive Conservative Party from 2001 to 2022. His father, Frank Miller, was also a Progressive Conservative MPP from the region for 11 years, and briefly served as Premier of Ontario in 1985.

Background
Miller started a Muskoka Young Progressive Conservative organization in 1975, and has been active in the party since this time. He is a commercial pilot and has served as president of Muskoka Tourism.

Miller along with his wife Chris, and their children Abigail, Renne, Winston and Stuart owned and operated a lodge called Patterson Kaye between the 1980s until 2005.

Politics
Miller was elected to the Ontario legislature in a 2001 by-election, called after Ernie Eves resigned his seat in the legislature; he defeated Liberal Evelyn Brown by about 4000 votes. In April 2002, Miller was appointed as Parliamentary Assistant to the Minister of Northern Development and Mines.

Miller was re-elected by an increased margin in the 2003 provincial election, although the Progressive Conservatives were reduced to only 24 out of 103 seats in the legislature as the Liberals won a commanding majority.  In 2004, he supported John Tory in the latter's successful bid to succeed Eves as leader of the Progressive Conservative Party.

He was re-elected in 2007, 2011, 2014 and 2018.

Electoral record

References

External links
 
 

1956 births
Canadian aviators
Living people
Progressive Conservative Party of Ontario MPPs
21st-century Canadian politicians
Commercial aviators